is a notable Japanese rugby union coach, formerly of Waseda University RFC (2001–06) and now (since 2006) of Suntory Sungoliath. Many in Japan had hoped he would coach the national side in the future however after he criticized the then current coach Eddie Jones in August 2015 support has dramatically dropped. He is the father of  Japanese baseball prodigy, Kotaro Kiyomiya.

Early life
He was born in Osaka prefecture on July 25, 1967, and after a juvenile delinquent period was advised to play rugby to give his life some direction by a junior high school teacher. Since that time he has been interested in, and passionate about, education. (He has also founded the WASEDA CLUB NPO in Tokyo to encourage the interest of children in many sports, and the Oku-Inoue Fund for the children of Iraq.)

Player
He played for All-Japan High Schools and captained the team in his third year at Matta high school in Osaka. He attended Waseda University and played rugby there and won the university championship when captain in his fourth year at the university. His position was flanker or No. 8.

After graduation he started work at the Suntory beverage company in 1995 and played rugby for them. He is not able to drink alcohol.

Coach
From 2001 to 2006, he was a very successful coach of Waseda University Rugby Football Club leading them to three university championships in five years, including successive championships in 2005 and 2006, and he has now returned to Suntory Sungoliath in the Top League as their full-time professional head coach.

In his first season as coach of Sungoliath his team was second in the league behind Toshiba Brave Lupus, after losing narrowly 10–12 to their Fuchu city rivals in a 'Fuchu derby'. In the Microsoft Cup Final 2007, Suntory lost on the last play of the game after injury time had finished. The final score was 13–14 in favour of Toshiba.

After a game against Yamaha in September of the 2006 Top League season which Suntory lost, Kiyomiya used the term "necessary loss" in his blog, by which he meant that it was a game Suntory had to lose for the team to be in a position to challenge for the league and championship. This concept has also been adopted by John Kirwan in coaching Japan at RWC 2007.

In the opening game of the 2007–8 season Kiyomiya's Suntory gained revenge, beating Toshiba 10–3 on October 26, 2007, under lights at Chichibunomiya. After the game coach Kiyomiya declared that his team would win all the remaining league games and the championship. They in fact lost two and drew one, but won the fifth Microsoft Cup and so became champions of the Top League for the first time in 2007–08.

In 2011, he became head coach of Yamaha Júbilo.

Notable Victories
On February 12, 2006, Coach Kiyomiya's Waseda defeated Toyota Verblitz, a team which included stars such as Troy Flavell and Filo Tiatia in the 43rd Japan Championships. This was the first time ever that a university team had defeated a Top League team, though Waseda also defeated Toshiba, a company team, when Mr. Kiyomiya was a student player.

On February 24, 2008 Suntory Sungoliath coached by Kiyomiya-san defeated Sanyo Wild Knights in the final of the Microsoft Cup to become the champions of the 2007-08 Top League.

See also
Katsuhiko Oku

References
 ULTIMATE CRUSH: Waseda University Rugby, Leadership and Building the Strongest Winning Team in Japan, by Katsuyuki Kiyomiya, translated into English by Ian Ruxton (September 2006).   (preview) The original was a book by Mr. Kiyomiya published in Japanese in February 2006 entitled Kyukyoku no Shori:Ultimate Crush   .

1967 births
Living people
Japanese rugby union players
Waseda University Rugby Football Club players
Japanese rugby union coaches
21st-century Japanese people